Eschata rififi is a moth in the family Crambidae. It was described by Stanisław Błeszyński in 1965. It is found in Darjeeling, India.

References

Chiloini
Moths described in 1965